Dareh Lak (also Romanized as Dāreh Lak; also known as Darreh Lak and Dārlak) is a village in Mokriyan-e Gharbi Rural District, in the Central District of Mahabad County, West Azerbaijan Province, Iran. At the 2006 census, its population was 1,454, in 262 families.

References 

Populated places in Mahabad County